The 1950 Challenge Desgrange-Colombo was the third edition of the Challenge Desgrange-Colombo. It included ten races: all the races form the 1949 edition were retained with no additions.

Races

Final standings

Riders

Nations

References

 
Challenge Desgrange-Colombo
Challenge Desgrange-Colombo